Abdelmalek Ziaya (born 23 January 1984) is an Algerian footballer who plays for Algerian Ligue Professionnelle 2 club USM Annaba.

Career

ES Sétif
Ziaya was born in Guelma. He played regularly in ES Sétif's first team, and was a fixture in the club's 2006–07 Arab Champions League triumph, scoring a goal against Al-Ittihad in the second round and against Al-Nasr in the group stage. Ziaya scored again in the 2007–08 Arab Champions League versus Al-Wehda in the round of 16.

On 26 December 2009, it was announced that the 25-year-old Algerian striker was going to move on loan from ES Sétif to FC Sochaux with an option to buy. However, four days later, it was reported that ES Sétif president refused to loan the player to Sochaux and was negotiating with Saudi Arabian club Ittihad Jeddah.

Ittihad Jeddah
On 6 January 2010, Ziaya signed a two-year contract with Saudi Arabian Ittihad Jeddah, with the club paying €2 million for the transfer. He scored two goals in his first game for the club, a 4–1 win in a friendly against Al-Ettifaq. On 23 February 2010, Ziaya made his official debut for Al-Ittihad in an AFC Champions League match against FC Bunyodkor in Uzbekistan, with the score ending 3–0 in favour of the home side. He scored his first official goal for the club on 8 March 2010 in an AFC Champions League match Zob Ahan. Ziaya scored the goal in the 16th minute of the game, with the game ending 2–2. In his first league game for Ittihad, on 14 March against Al-Ahli, he delivered an assist to Manaf Abushgeer for the only goal of the game. Despite achieving only one championship with the team in two years, he is considered to be one of Ittihad's greatest strikers recently and has expressed his urge to rejoin Saudi Arabia.

Club Athlétique Bizertin
On 29 July 2012, Ziaya signed a two-year contract with Tunisian club CA Bizertin. On 1 August 2012, he made his official debut for the club in a league game against ES Zarzis, scoring a goal on the occasion.

International career
After showing excellent form for ES Setif in 2009, scoring 15 goals in 13 games in the 2009 CAF Confederation Cup and a further 8 goals in first half of the domestic league, Ziaya was called up by Rabah Saadane for the 2010 African Cup of Nations in Angola.

On 12 January 2010, Ziaya made his debut for the Algerian National Team coming on as a substitute in the 63rd minute in a group game against Malawi at the 2010 African Cup of Nations.

Career statistics

Honours

Club
ES Sétif
 Arab Champions League: 2007, 2008
 Algerian League: 2007, 2009
 North African Cup of Champions: 2009
 Finalist of the CAF Confederation Cup: 2009

Ittihad FC
 Saudi Champions Cup: 2010

Individual
 2009 CAF Confederation Cup top scorer (15 goals in 13 games)

References

External links
 Player profile 

1984 births
Living people
Algerian footballers
2010 Africa Cup of Nations players
Association football forwards
ES Sétif players
Ittihad FC players
Expatriate footballers in Saudi Arabia
People from Guelma
Algerian expatriate sportspeople in Saudi Arabia
ES Guelma players
CA Bizertin players
Expatriate footballers in Tunisia
Algerian expatriate sportspeople in Tunisia
USM Alger players
Algeria international footballers
21st-century Algerian people